Cricklewood Studios, also known as the Stoll Film Studios, were British film studios located in Cricklewood, London which operated from 1920 to 1938. Run by Sir Oswald Stoll as the principal base for his newly formed Stoll Pictures, which also operated Surbiton Studios, the studio was the largest in the British Isles at that time. It was later used for the production of "quota quickies" (to meet the requirements of the Cinematograph Films Act 1927). In 1938, the studios were sold off for non-film use.



Fictional studios
Cricklewood Greats was a 2012 spoof documentary created by Peter Capaldi for BBC Four, about a different and entirely fictional film production company, also set in Cricklewood, which he called Cricklewood Film Studios.

See also
 List of Stoll Pictures films

References

Bibliography
 Warren, Patricia. British Film Studios: An Illustrated History. Batsford, 2001.

British film studios
Buildings and structures in the London Borough of Barnet
Film production companies of the United Kingdom
Cricklewood